The action of 2 September 1781 was a minor naval engagement fought off Cape Ann during the American War of Independence; HMS Chatham captured the French frigate Magicienne after a fight of a few hours.

On 2 September, the British fifty gun fourth rate HMS Chatham under Captain Andrew Snape Douglas was cruising off Cape Ann near Boston harbour and spotted the French frigate Magicienne, escorting a merchantman. She was a thirty six gun 800 ton frigate that was serving in comte d'Orvilliers fleet and was commanded by Captain Janvre de la Bouchetière with 280 men.

Douglas ordered action stations, and the Chatham hove to and after a few hours chase opened the action; she overtook the French frigate. The London Gazette claims that after an hour's action, the Chatham got the better of the French and Magicienne soon struck; The New York gazette of 22 October 1781 gives a figure of 2 hours and a half, of which half at pistol range, and Magicienne only struck after her rudder and bowsprit were shot away.

The Chatham had one man killed and one wounded while losses on the Magicienne were heavy; the London Gazette gives a figure of 32 killed and 54 wounded, while the New York Gazette states that 155 were killed or wounded, including Ensign Dethan, killed, and Captain de la Bouchetière, wounded. The rest of the crew was taken prisoner. She was subsequently taken to Halifax and recommissioned in the Royal Navy as HMS Magicienne.

Sagittaire, Astrée and Hermione, which were anchored at Boston, scrambled in an attempt to support Magicienne, but they failed to arrive on time, and Chatam could escape with her prize. The merchantman that Magicienne was escorting managed to escape Chatam and arrived safely in a French-held harbour.

Subsequently the action thwarted a planned French assault on British ships in the Saint John River.

Notes

References
 
 
 
 
 

Naval battles of the American Revolutionary War involving France
Naval battles of the American Revolutionary War
Conflicts in 1781
1781 in Massachusetts
Naval battles of the Anglo-French War (1778–1783)
Battles in the Northern Coastal theater of the American Revolutionary War after Saratoga
Battles of the American Revolutionary War in Massachusetts
Events in Essex County, Massachusetts